Strychnos staudtii is a species of plant in the Loganiaceae family. It is found in Cameroon and Gabon. Its natural habitat is subtropical or tropical moist lowland forests. It is threatened by habitat loss.

References

staudtii
Vulnerable plants
Taxonomy articles created by Polbot